Jan Horáček (born 22 May, 1979) is a Czech former professional ice hockey player who last played with HC Vlasim in the Czech Republic.

Career statistics

External links

References

Living people
1979 births
Czech ice hockey defencemen
Hamilton Bulldogs (AHL) players
HC Berounští Medvědi players
HC Bílí Tygři Liberec players
HC Havířov players
HC Košice players
HC Slavia Praha players
HC Slovan Bratislava players
HC Tábor players
HC Vityaz players
HKM Zvolen players
Metallurg Novokuznetsk players
Moncton Wildcats players
People from Benešov
Peoria Rivermen (ECHL) players
PSG Berani Zlín players
Ritten Sport players
St. Louis Blues draft picks
Toronto Roadrunners players
VHK Vsetín players
Worcester IceCats players
Sportspeople from the Central Bohemian Region
Czech expatriate ice hockey players in Canada
Czech expatriate ice hockey players in Russia
Czech expatriate ice hockey players in Sweden
Czech expatriate ice hockey players in Slovakia
Czech expatriate ice hockey players in the United States
Czech expatriate sportspeople in Italy
Expatriate ice hockey players in Italy